Selevasio-Ryan Valao (born 7 January 1998) is a Wallisian athlete who has represented Wallis and Futuna at the Pacific Games and Pacific Mini Games.

At the 2017 Pacific Mini Games in Port Vila he won gold in the shot put and silver in the discus.

At the 2019 Pacific Games in Apia he won silver in the discus.

References

Living people
1998 births
Wallis and Futuna discus throwers
Wallis and Futuna shot putters